Boiling down was the term used in Australia for the process of rendering the fat from animal carcasses to produce tallow. It was a common activity on farms and pastoral properties to produce tallow to be made into soap and candles for domestic use. 

Boiling down was industrialised in the 1840s, providing the rural sector with a valuable export commodity. It was particularly significant as it came during the 1840s economic depression when the pastoral industry was at a standstill and sheep and cattle otherwise had little value in the colonies.

Beginnings

The export market for Australian wool suffered a severe price slump in the 1840s. Low demand for cattle and sheep to stock new pastoral runs and the small local market for beef, mutton or lamb meant cattle and sheep had little value in the colonies. Boiling-down works provided a vital source of income to the squatters when sheep were selling for as low as sixpence each. Pastoralist George Russell built a boiling works at Golf Hill Station, in the Western District (Victoria), and expressed his belief that, "melting down the Stock has been the salvation of the colonies."

Henry O'Brien of Yass experimented with boiling down sheep in large cauldrons to extract the tallow (fat for soap and candle making). He publicised his experiments in an article that appeared in The Sydney Morning Herald on 19 June 1843. It was reprinted in various other colonial newspapers and is credited with kick-starting the production of tallow as a new export industry in rural Australia. Even when the wool price recovered, boiling down works helped maintain a minimum price for sheep of around five shillings per head.

Langlands and Fulton operated an iron foundry at 131 Flinders St West, Melbourne, Australia, where Fulton developed a technique for boiling-down sheep for tallow around in 1843-44 when squatters slaughtered their otherwise worthless sheep in the thousands due to a rural depression.

In Victoria, Joseph Raleigh is credited with one of the first large scale boiling-down works, when in 1840 he erected a plant near the Stoney Creek Backwash in Yarraville. From a very small quantity of 50 tons of tallow produced in 1843, to 430 in tons in 1844, over 4500 tons, worth £130,000 were produced in 1850 in Victoria alone.

Robert King opened the first boiling down works in the Bremer River area of Ipswich, Queensland in 1847, followed by John Campbell and John Smith, creating a self-contained village of Town Marie.

Further reading
K. L. Fry, “Boiling down in the 1840s: A Grimy Means to a Solvent End,” Labour History  No. 25 (Nov., 1973), pp. 1–18

References

Animal products
Manufacturing in Australia
Food processing
Meat processing in Australia
Australian sheep industry